Lloyd Longfield  (born October 8, 1956) is a Canadian Liberal politician, who was elected to represent the riding of Guelph in the House of Commons of Canada in the 2015 federal election. The riding was previously held by Liberal MP Frank Valeriote who had opted not to run for re-election.

Early life
A native of Winnipeg, he moved to Guelph in 1992. Longfield has a BA in English and Mathematics from the University of Manitoba and a diploma in Mechanical Engineering from Red River College. Prior to running for federal office, Longfield was the president of the Guelph Chamber of Commerce for "about" eight years.

Political career
Longfield was successful in retaining the Guelph seat in the House of Commons for the Liberals in 2015 by an overwhelming margin, with nearly 50 percent of the popular vote or over 15,000 votes ahead of the Conservative candidate Gloria Kovach.

After being elected, Longfield promised to vote to increase funding to the CBC and to stop the phase-out of door-to-door mail delivery. The latter was a part of the Liberal platform as described by Justin Trudeau in a September 25, 2015 letter: "we will also stop the Harper Conservatives' plan to end door-to-door mail delivery and ensure Canadians receive the postal service on which they rely."

He was re-elected in the 2019 federal election.

Personal life
Longfield and his wife, Barbara, have three daughters and four grandchildren.

Electoral record

References

External links
 Official Website
 House of Commons profile
 
 Speeches, votes and activity at OpenParliament.ca

1956 births
Living people
Businesspeople from Winnipeg
Members of the House of Commons of Canada from Ontario
Liberal Party of Canada MPs
People from Guelph
Politicians from Winnipeg
Red River College alumni
University of Manitoba alumni
21st-century Canadian politicians